John Theodore Rettaliata (August 18, 1911 – August 8, 2009) was a fluid dynamicist who was president of Illinois Institute of Technology for 21 years, from 1952 to 1973, and served on President Dwight D. Eisenhower's National Aeronautics and Space Council, the predecessor to NASA. He received the American Society of Mechanical Engineers/Pi Tau Sigma joint Gold Medal in 1942, received the Distinguished Alumnus Award of Johns Hopkins University, was a National Honorary Member of the Triangle Fraternity, and held a lifetime position on the Museum of Science and Industry Board of Trustees. He also held the distinction of being one of the first people to fly in a jet aircraft. Illinois Institute of Technology has a professorial position dedicated to Rettaliata, the John T. Rettaliata Distinguished Professor of Mechanical and Aerospace Engineering, currently occupied by Hassan M. Nagib.

Biography
Rettaliata attended the Baltimore Polytechnic Institute magnet high school which enabled him to enter Johns Hopkins University as a sophomore in 1929. He graduated with a Ph.D. in 1936. Rettaliata died on August 8, 2009 at the age of 97.

Notes

1911 births
2009 deaths
Scientists from Baltimore
Baltimore Polytechnic Institute alumni
Illinois Institute of Technology faculty
Johns Hopkins University alumni
Presidents of Illinois Institute of Technology
Eisenhower administration personnel